The Carlos Palanca Memorial Awards for Literature winners in the year 1971 (rank, title of winning entry, name of author).

English division
Short story
First prize: "The Ritual" by Cirilo F. Bautista
Second prize: "Beast in the Fields" by Resil Mojares
Third prize: "Children of the City" by Amadis Ma. Guerrero’

Poetry
First prize: "The Archipelago" by Cirilo F. Bautista
Second prize: "Five Poems" by Wilfredo Pascua Sanchez
Third prize: "From Mactan to Mendiola" by Federico Licsi Espino Jr.

One-act play
First prize: "The Grotesque Among Us" by Maidan T. Flores
Second prize: "Age of Prometheus" by Jesus T. Peralta
Third prize: "Operation Pacification" by Alfredo O. Cuenca Jr.

Filipino (Tagalog) division
Short story in Filipino
First prize: "Ipis sa Guhong Templo" by Edgardo B. Maranan
Second prize: "Isang Araw sa Buhay ni Juan Lazaro" by Jose Reyes Munsayac
Third prize: "Maria, Ang Iyong Anak" by Wilfredo Pa. Virtusio

Poetry in Filipino
First prize: "Mga Duguang Plakard at Iba Pang Tula" by Rogelio Mangahas
Second prize: "Tatlong Awit ng Pagpuksa" by Lamberto E. Antonio
Third prize: "Tinikling (Dalawang Tula)" by Cirilo F. Bautista

One-act play in Filipino
First prize: "Dugo sa Uhay ng Luntiang Palayan" by Victor V. Francisco
Second prize: "Langit at Lupa" by Fernando L. Samonte
Third prize: "Panahon ng Digma" by Alberto S. Florentino Jr.

More winners by year

References
 

1971
1971 literary awards